This is a list of animated feature films that were released in 2018.

{| class="sortable wikitable"
|+ Animated feature films first released in 2018
|-
! scope="col" | Title
! scope="col" | Country
! scope="col" | Director
! scope="col" | Studio
! scope="col" | Animation technique
! scope="col" | Notes
! scope="col" | Type
! scope="col" | Release date
! scope="col" | Duration
|-
| Alibaba and the Three Golden Hair阿里巴巴三根金发 (Ali baba sangen jin fa) || China || Jiang Yefeng ||  || CG animation ||  || || December 30, 2018 || 85 minutes
|-
| Allahyar and the Legend of Markhor || Pakistan || Uzair Zaheer Khan || 3rd World Studio || CG animation || || || February 2, 2018 || 90 minutes
|-
| Anemone – Eureka Seven: Hi-Evolution 2 || Japan || Tomoki Kyoda || Bones || Traditional || || || November 10, 2018  || 90 minutes 
|-
| Another Day of Life || PolandSpainGermanyBelgiumHungary || Raúl de la FuenteDamian Nenow || Kanaki FilmsPlatige ImagePuppetworks Animation Studio || CG animation || || || May 11, 2018  || 85 minutes
|-
| Asterix: The Secret of the Magic PotionAsterix: The Secret Of The Magic Potion|| France || Alexandre Astier, Louis Clichy || SND, Mikros Image || CG animation || || || December 5, 2018 || 87 minutes
|-
| Attack on Titan: The Roar of Awakening || Japan || Tetsurō Araki, Masashi Koizuka || Wit Studio || Traditional ||  || || January 13, 2018 || 120 minutes
|-
| Batman: Gotham by Gaslight || United States || Sam Liu || Warner Bros. AnimationDC Entertainment || Traditional || || || January 12, 2018 January 23, 2018 February 6, 2018  || 78 minutes
|-
| Bamse and the Thunderbell  Bamse och dunderklockan || Sweden || Christian Ryltenius, Maria Blom ||  SF Studios || Traditional || || || December 21, 2018 || 65 minutes
|-
| Batman Ninja || United StatesJapan || Junpei Mizusaki || Warner Bros. AnimationKamikaze Douga || Traditional / CG animation ||  || || April 24, 2018 June 15, 2018  || 85 minutes
|-
| Black is Beltza|| Spain || Fermín Muguruza || Black is Beltza AIE, Talka Records, Euskal Irrati Telebista, Setmàgic Audiovisual  || Traditional || || || October 5, 2018 || 88 minutes
|-
| Big World! Big Adventures! The Movie || United States || David Stoten || HiT Entertainment, Mattel Creations || CG animation || || || July 7, 2018 July 20, 2018 September 7, 2018  || 85 minutes
|-
| Boonie Bears: The Big Shrink || China || Liang Ding || || CG animation ||  || || February 16, 2018 || 90 minutes
|-
| The Boxcar Children: Surprise Island || United States || Anna ChiMark A.Z. DippéWonjae Lee || Blueberry Pictures, Legacy Classics Family Entertainment || CG animation || || || May 8, 2018 || 81 minutes
|-
| Bungo Stray Dogs: Dead Apple || Japan || Takuya Igarashi || Bones || Traditional ||  || || March 3, 2018 || 90 minutes
|-
| Buñuel in the Labyrinth of the TurtlesBuñuel en el Laberinto de las Tortugas || SpainNetherlands ||  Salvador Simó || Sygnatia, Submarine || Traditional || || || October 20, 2018 April 26, 2019  || 77 minutes
|-
| Captain Morten and the Spider QueenKapten Morten Lollide Laeval || EstoniaIrelandBelgium || Kaspar Jancis || Nukufilm, Telegael, Calon, Grid Animation || Stop Motion || || || June 5, 2018 March 21, 2019  || 79 minutes
|-
| Capt'n SharkyKäpt'n Sharky || Germany ||  Jan Stoltz, Hubert Weiland || Caligari Film, Universum Film || CG animation ||  || || August 30, 2018 || 73 minutes
|-
| Cats and Peachtopia || China || Gary Wang || Light Chaser Animation Studios || CG animation ||  || || April 5, 2018 || 105 minutes
|-
| Cattle HillKuToppen || Norway || Lise I. Osvoll || Qvisten Animation || CG animation ||  || || October 19, 2018 || 66 minutes
|-
| Charming || United StatesCanada || Ross Venokur || Vanguard Animation || CG animation ||  || || April 20, 2018 June 24, 2019  || 85 minutes
|-
| Checkered NinjaTernet Ninja || Denmark ||  Thorbjørn Christoffersen, Anders Matthesen || A. Film, Pop Up Production, Sudoku ApS || CG animation ||  || || December 25, 2018 || 81 minutes
|-
| Chris the Swiss || SwitzerlandGermanyCroatiaFinland || Anja Kofmel || Dschoint Ventschr, Ma.Ja.De, Nukleus film || Traditional || || || May 13, 2018  || 90 minutes
|-
| Chuck Steel: Night of the Trampires || United Kingdom || Michael Mort || Animortal Studio || Stop Motion || || || June 12, 2018  || 89 minutes
|-
| Cinderella and the Secret Prince || United States || Lynne Southerland || Gold Valley Films || CG animation || || || 2018 || 90 minutes
|-
| Coconut the Little Dragon: Into the JungleDer kleine Drache Kokosnuss – Auf in den Dschungel! || Germany ||  Anthony Power || Caligari Film || CG animation ||  || || December 27, 2018 || 80 minutes
|-
| Code Geass Lelouch of the Resurrection the Movie: Imperial Path || Japan || Gorō Taniguchi || Sunrise || Traditional ||  || || May 26, 2018 ||
|-
| Code Geass Lelouch of the Resurrection the Movie: Rebellion Path || Japan || Gorō Taniguchi || Sunrise || Traditional ||  || || February 10, 2018 ||
|-
| Constantine City of Demons: The Movie || United States || Doug Murphy || Warner Bros. AnimationDC Entertainment || Traditional ||  || || October 4, 2018 October 9, 2018  || 90 minutes
|-
| Crayon Shin-chan: Burst Serving! Kung Fu Boys ~Ramen Rebellion~ || Japan || Wataru Takahashi || Toho || Traditional ||  || || April 13, 2018 || 104 minutes
|-
| Dajjal: The Slayer and His Follower || Pakistan || Rana Abrar || WBJ Media || CG Animation ||  || || December 2018 || 100 minutes
|-
| The Death of Superman || United States ||Jake CastorenaSam Liu || Warner Bros. AnimationDC Entertainment || Traditional || || || July 20, 2018 July 24, 2018  || 81 minutes
|-
| DC Super Hero Girls: Legends of Atlantis || United States || Cecilia AranovichIan Hamilton || Warner Bros. AnimationDC Entertainment || Traditional || || || July 22, 2018 October 2, 2018  || 72 minutes
|-
| Detective Conan: Zero the Enforcer || Japan || Tachikawa Yuzuru || Toho Company, Ltd. || Traditional ||  || || April 13, 2018 || 110 minutes
|-
| Digimon Adventure tri. Future || Japan || Keitaro Motonaga || Toei Animation || Traditional || || || May 5, 2018 || 97 minutes 
|-
| Dilili in Paris Dilili à Paris || FranceBelgiumGermany || Michel Ocelot || Nord-Ouest Films, Studio O, Mars Films || Traditional || || || June 11, 2018 October 10, 2018 October 24, 2018 May 1, 2019  || 95 minutes
|-
| The Donkey King || Pakistan || Aziz Jindani || Talisman Studios || CG animation ||  || || October 13, 2018 || 105 minutes
|-
| Doraemon the Movie: Nobita's Treasure Island || Japan || Kazuaki Imai || Toho || Traditional ||  || || March 3, 2018 || 108 minutes
|-
| Dr. Seuss' The Grinch || United States || Yarrow Cheney, Scott Mosier || Illumination Entertainment || CG animation ||  || || October 22, 2018 November 9, 2018  || 85 minutes
|-
| Dragon Ball Super: Broly || Japan ||Tatsuya Nagamine ||Toei Animation|| Traditional || || || December 14, 2018 || 100 minutes
|-
| Duck Duck Goose || United States || Chris Jenkins || Original Force Animation || CG animation ||  || || March 9, 2018 July 20, 2018  || 91 minutes
|-
| Early Man || United Kingdom || Nick Park || Aardman AnimationsBritish Film Institute || Stop-motion ||  || || January 20, 2018 January 26, 2018  || 87 minutes
|-
| Eiga Shimajirō: Mahou no Shima no dai Boken || Japan || Hiroshi KawamataTakashima Hiro || || Traditional ||  || || 2018 || 52 minutes
|-
| Elliot the Littlest Reindeer|| Canada || Jennifer Westcott || Awesometown Entertainment, Double Dutch International, Elgin Road Productions || CG animation ||  || || October 19, 2018 December 4, 2018 
|-
| Enchanted Princess Чудо-Юдо || Russia || Artyom Lukichev || Karo Premiere || Traditional ||  || || January 1, 2018 || 75 minutes
|-
| Funan || FranceBelgiumLuxembourgCambodia || Denis Do ||Les Films d'Ici, Lunanime, Bac Films, Web Spider Production, Ithinkasia || Traditional || || || June 11, 2018 March 6, 2019 April 24, 2019  || 84 minutes
|-
| Gekijōban Haikara-san ga Tōru Kōhen – Tokyo Dai Roman || Japan || Kazuhiro Furuhashi, Toshiaki Kidokoro || Nippon Animation || Traditional ||  || || October 19, 2018 || 105 minutes
|-
| Girls und Panzer: Dai 63 Kai Sensha-dou Zenkoku Koukousei Taikai Soushuuhen || Japan || Tsutomu Mizushima || Actas || Traditional ||  || || November 11, 2017 || 122 minutes
|-
| Goosebumps 2: Haunted Halloween || United States || Ari Sandel || |Columbia Pictures, Sony Pictures Animation, Original Film, Scholastic Entertainment, Silvertongue Film || |CG animation / Live-action || || || October 8, 2018 October 12, 2018  || 90 minutes
|-
| Godzilla: City on the Edge of Battle || Japan || Hiroyuki SeshitaKōbun Shizuno || Polygon Pictures || Traditional || || || May 18, 2018 || 100 minutes
|-
| Hanuman vs Mahiravana || India || Ezhil Vendan || Green Gold Animations || CG Animation ||  || || July 6, 2018 || 96 minutes
|-
| Happy Little Submarine: 20000 Leagues under the Sea || China || Yu Shen || Shenzhen GDC || Traditional ||  || || June 1, 2018 || 75 minutes
|-
|The Haunted House: The Secret of the Cave신비아파트: 금빛 도깨비와 비밀의 동굴 || South Korea || Kim Byung-gab || CJ ENM, Studio BAZOOKA || Traditional ||  || || July 25, 2018 || 68 minutes
|-
| Henchmen || Canada || Adam Wood || Bron Studios || CG animation ||  || || December 7, 2018 || 89 minutes
|-
| Here Comes the Grump || MexicoUnited Kingdom || Andrés Couturier || Ánima EstudiosGFM AnimationPrime Focus World || CG animation ||  || || March 1, 2018 July 26, 2018  || 97 minutes
|-
| Hoffmaniada || Russia || Stanislav Sokolov || Soyuzmultfilm || Stop-motion || || || February 18, 2018 June 11, 2018 October 11, 2018  || 75 minutes
|-
| Hoppi Land  :hu:Egy év Hoppifalván || Hungary ||Ferenc Rofusz ||The Hoppies || 2D animation || TV Movie || || March 17, 2018 || 71 minutes
|-
| Hotel Transylvania 3: Summer Vacation || United States || Genndy Tartakovsky || Sony Pictures Animation || CG animation ||  || || June 13, 2018 July 13, 2018  || 97 minutes
|-
| Howard Lovecraft and the Kingdom of Madness || Canada || Sean Patrick O'Reilly || Arcana Studio || CG animation ||  || || December 4, 2018 || 75 minutes
|-
| Incredibles 2 || United States || Brad Bird || Pixar || CG animation ||  || || June 5, 2018 June 15, 2018  || 118 minutes
|-
| Infini-T Force the Movie and Infinimals Forces || Japan || Jun Matsumoto || Tatsunoko ProductionDigital Frontier || CG animation ||  || || February 24, 2018 || 90 minutes
|-
| Isle of Dogs || United States || Wes Anderson || Fox Searchlight Pictures, Indian Paintbrush || Stop-motion ||  || || February 15, 2018 March 23, 2018 May 10, 2018  || 101 minutes
|-
| I Want to Eat Your PancreasKimi no Suizō o Tabetai || Japan || Shinichiro Ushijima || Studio VOLN || Traditional || || || September 1, 2018 || 108 minutes
|-
| K: Seven Stories || Japan || Shingo Suzuki || GoHands || Traditional ||  || || July 7, 2018August 4, 2018September 1, 2018October 6, 2018November 3, 2018December 1, 2018 || 59–66 minutes
|-
| Kikoriki. Deja Vu Смешарики. Дежавю || Russia || Denis Chernov || Petersburg Animation Studio || CG animation || || || April 26, 2018 || 85 minutes
|-
| King Shakir: Let the Game BeginKral Sakir: Oyun Zamani || Turkey || Haluk Can Dizdaroglu, Berk Tokay || Grafi2000BKM || CG animation || || || May 11, 2018 || 74 minutes
|-
| The Last Fiction|| Iran || Ashkan Rahgozar || Hoorakhsh studio || Traditional ||  || || June 12, 2018  || 100 minutes
|-
| The Legend of Muay Thai: 9 Satra || Thailand || Pongsa Kornsri, Nat Yodsawattananon, Gun Phansuwan || M Pictures || CG animation || || || January 11, 2018December 25, 2019  || 102 minutes
|-
| Lego DC Comics Super Heroes: Aquaman: Rage of Atlantis || United States || Matt Peters ||Warner Bros. Animation, DC Entertainment, The Lego Group|| CG animation || || || July 22, 2018 July 31, 2018  || 77 minutes
|-
| Lego DC Comics Super Heroes: The Flash || United States || Ethan Spaulding ||Warner Bros. Animation, DC Entertainment, The Lego Group|| CG animation || || || February 13, 2018 March 13, 2018  || 78 minutes
|-
| Lego DC Super Hero Girls: Super-Villain High || United States || Elsa Garagarza ||Warner Bros. Animation, DC Entertainment, The Lego Group|| CG animation|| || || May 1, 2018 May 15, 2018  || 78 minutes
|-
| Leo Da Vinci: Mission Mona Lisa || ItalyPoland || Sergio Manfio || Gruppo Alcuni || CG animation || || || January 11, 2018 || 85 minutes
|-
| The Ladybug || China || Ding Shi || Its Cartoon Animation Studio || CG animation || || || February 2, 2018 || 75 minutes
|-
| La Leyenda del Charro Negro || Mexico || Alberto Rodriguez || Ánima Estudios || Flash ||  || || January 19, 2018 || 85 minutes
|-
| Liz and the Blue BirdRizu to Aoi tori || Japan || Naoko Yamada || Kyoto Animation || Traditional ||  || || April 21, 2018 || 90 minutes
|-
| Louis & Luca – Mission to the MoonSolan og Ludvig –  Månelyst i Flåklypa || Norway || Rasmus A. Sivertsen || Maipo Film, Qvisten Animation || Stop motion ||  || || September 21, 2018 || 80 minutes
|-
| Love, Chunibyo & Other Delusions! Take on Me || Japan || Tatsuya Ishihara || Kyoto Animation || Traditional ||  || || January 6, 2018 || 90 minutes
|-
| Luis and the AliensLuis und die Aliens || GermanyLuxembourgDenmark || Christoph Lauenstein, Wolfgang Lauenstein ||  Ulysses Filmproduktion, Fabrique d'Images, A. Film Production || CG animation || || || March 22, 2018 May 24, 2018 August 17, 2018 August 24, 2018  || 86 minutes
|-
| Macross Delta the Movie: Passionate Walkūre || Japan || Kenji Yasuda || Studio NueSatelight || Traditional ||  || || February 9, 2018 || 119 minutes
|-
| Magical Girl Lyrical Nanoha Detonation || Japan || Takayuki Hamana || Seven Arcs || Traditional ||  || || October 19, 2018 || 111 minutes
|-
| Magic Birds: The Movie || Greece || Nikos Vergitsis || Art Toons || Traditional  ||  || || January 15, 2015 || 
|-
| Magic Mirror 2 || China || Chengfeng ZhengYang Li || Huaxia Film Distribution Co.,LtdBeijing Yingshikong Media Co.,Ltd || Traditional ||  || || June 1, 2018 || 
|-
| Maquia: When the Promised Flower BloomsSayonara no Asa ni Yakusoku no Hana o Kazarō || Japan || Mari Okada || P.A.Works || CG animation ||  || || February 24, 2018 || 115 minutes
|-
| Marcianos vs. Mexicanos || Mexico || Gabriel Riva Palacio AlatristeRodolfo Riva Palacio Alatriste || Huevocartoon Producciones || Traditional ||  || || March 9, 2018 || 87 minutes
|-
| Marnie's WorldMarnies WeltSpy Cat || FranceGermanyBelgium || Christoph Lauenstein, Wolfgang Lauenstein || Grid Animation, Seven Pictures, Schubert International Filmproduktions, Scopas Medien || CG animation ||  || || June 13, 2018  || 84 minutes
|-
| Mary Poppins Returns || United States || Rob Marshall || Walt Disney Pictures || Traditional / Live-action || || || November 29, 2018 December 19, 2018  || 131 minutes
|-
| Marvel Rising: Secret Warriors || United States || Alfred Gimeno ||Marvel Animation|| Traditional || || || September 30, 2018 || 80 minutes
|-
| Maya the Bee: The Honey Games || GermanyAustralia || Noel Cleary, Sergio Delfino, Alexs Stadermann || UFA GmbH || CG animation || || || March 1, 2018 May 1, 2018 July 26, 2018  || 85 minutes
|-
| Memoirs of a Man in Pajamas Memorias de un hombre en pijama || Spain || Carlos Fernández de Vigo || Dream Team Concept, Ézaro Films, Hampa Studio || Traditional || || || April 14, 2018 November 9, 2018 November 16, 2018 January 4, 2019  || 74 minutes
|-
| MiraiMirai no Mirai || Japan || Mamoru Hosoda || Studio Chizu || Traditional ||  || || May 16, 2018 July 20, 2018  || 98 minutes
|-
| Mission Kathmandu: The Adventures of Nelly and Simon  Nelly et Simon: Mission Yéti || Canada || Nancy Florence Savard, Pierre Greco || Productions 10e Ave / Seville Films || CG animation ||  || || October 5, 2017 February 23, 2018  || 85 minutes
|-
| Motel Rose (Jang-mi-yeo-gwan) || South Korea || Yeo Eun-a ||  || Traditional ||  || || October 19, 2018 || 77 minutes
|-
| MugworthEl veritable conte de Nadal || Spain || Marc Fernandez ||  || Traditional || || || November 7, 2018 || 70 minutes
|-
| My Hero Academia: Two Heroes || Japan || Kenji Nagasaki || Bones || Traditional ||  || || July 5, 2018 August 3, 2018  || 97 minutes
|-
| Natsume's Book of Friends the Movie || Japan || Takahiro Omori, Hideaki Itō || Shuka || Traditional ||  || || September 29, 2018 || 104 minutes
|-
| Next Gen || CanadaUnited States || Kevin R. Adams, Joe Ksander || Tangent Animation || CG Animation || || || September 7, 2018 || 105 minutes
|-
| Non Non Biyori Vacation || Japan || Shin'ya Kawatsura || Silver Link || Traditional ||  || || August 25, 2018 || 71 minutes
|-
| Norm of the North: Keys to the Kingdom || United States || Tim Maltby, Richard Finn (co-director) || Assemblage Entertainment / Discreet Arts Productions / Lionsgate / Splash Entertainment || CG animation ||  || || August 9, 2018 || 91 minutes
|-
| North of Blue || United States || Joanna Priestley || Joanna Priestley Motion Pictures || Traditional || || || June 11, 2018  || 60 minutes
|-
| Okko's InnWaka Okami wa Shogakusei! || Japan || Kitarô Kôsaka || Madhouse Inc. || Traditional || || || June 11, 2018 || 94 minutes
|-
| Pachamama || ArgentinaFrance || Juan Antin || O2B Films, Folivari, Doghouse Films|| Traditional || || || October 20, 2018 December 12, 2018 || 72 minutes
|-
| Peacemaker Kurogane || Japan || Hiroshi Takeuchi || White Fox || Traditional ||  || || June 2, 2018 November 17, 2018  || 109 minutes (total)
|-
| Penguin Highway || Japan || Hiroyasu Ishida || Studio Colorido || Traditional ||  || || July 29, 2018 August 17, 2018  || 118 minutes
|-
| Ploey: You Never Fly AloneLói – Þú flýgur aldrei einn || Iceland || Árni Ásgeirsson || GunHillCyborn || CG animation || || || February 2, 2018 || 82 minutes
|-
| Pretty Cure Super Stars! || Japan || Yōko Ikeda || Toei Animation || Traditional || || || March 17, 2018 || 
|-
| The Princess and the Dragon Принцесса и Дракон || Russia || Marina Nefedova || Licensing BrandsAA Studio || CG animation ||  || || August 23, 2018 || 75 minutes
|-
| Pokémon the Movie: The Power of Us || Japan || Tetsuo Yajima || OLMWit Studio || Traditional ||  || || July 13, 2018 || 100 minutes
|-
| Pocoyo And the League of Extraordinary Super Friends || Spain || Andy Yekes || Zinkia Entertainment || CG animation || || || June 22, 2018 || 49 minutes
|-
| RacetimeLa course des Tuques|| Canada || Benoit Godbout, François Brisson || CarpeDiem Film || CG animation ||  || || December 7, 2018 || 89 minutes
|-
| Ralph Breaks the Internet || United States || Rich Moore, Phil Johnston || Walt Disney Animation Studios || CG animation ||  || || November 5, 2018 November 21, 2018  || 112 minutes
|-
| Ruben Brandt, Collector:hu:Ruben Brandt, a gyűjtő || Hungary ||  Milorad Krstić || Sony Pictures Classics || Traditional /CG animation || || || August 9, 2018  || 94 minutes
|-
| Sadko Садко || Russia || Vitaly Mukhametzianov || InlayFilmCTB Film Company || CG animation || || || May 24, 2018 || 81 minutes
|-
| Scooby-Doo! & Batman: The Brave and the Bold || United States || Jake Castorena || Warner Bros. AnimationDC EntertainmentHanna-Barbera Cartoons || Traditional || || || January 6, 2018 January 9, 2018 ) || 75 minutes
|-
| Scooby-Doo! and the Gourmet Ghost || United States || Doug Murphy || Warner Bros Animation  Hanna Barbera Productions
|| Traditional || || Direct-to-video || July 22, 2018 (San Diego Comic-Con) August 28, 2018 (Digital) || 77 minutes
|-
| Seder-Masochism || United States || Nina Paley ||  || Traditional || || || June 11, 2018  || 78 minutes
|-
| The Seven Deadly Sins the Movie: Prisoners of the Sky || Japan || Noriyuki Abe, Yasuto Nishikata || A-1 Pictures || Traditional ||  || || August 18, 2018 || 99 minutes
|-
| Sgt. Stubby: An American Hero || United States || Richard Lanni || Mikros Image || CG animation ||  || || March 27, 2018 April 13, 2018  || 84 minutes
|-
| Sherlock Gnomes || United KingdomUnited States || John Stevenson || Rocket Pictures  Paramount Animation  Metro-Goldwyn-Mayer  Paramount Pictures || CG animation ||  || || March 23, 2018 May 11, 2018  || 86 minutes
|-
| Shimajiro the Movie: Adventures on Magic Island || Japan || Hiroshi Kawamata, Hiro Takashima || Benesse  Toho  Sony Music Direct || CG animation ||  || || March 9, 2018 || 52 minutes
|-
| Smallfoot || United States || Karey Kirkpatrick || Warner Animation Group || CG animation || || || September 28, 2018 || 96 minutes
|-
| The Snow Queen: Mirrorlands || Russia || Robert Lence, Aleksey Tsitsilin || Wizart Animation || CG animation || || || December 21, 2018 January 1, 2019  || 84 minutes
|-
| Spider-Man: Into the Spider-Verse || United States || Bob Persichetti, Peter Ramsey, Rodney Rothman || Sony Pictures Animation || CG animation/Traditional ||  || || December 1, 2018 December 14, 2018  || 117 minutes
|-
| The Stolen Princess || Ukraine || Oleh Malamuzh || Animagrad Animation StudioFILM.UA Group || CG animation ||  || || March 7, 2018 || 90 minutes
|-
| Strike || United Kingdom || Trevor Hardy || Gigglefish || Stop Motion ||  || || December 16, 2018 March 16, 2019  || 100 minutes
|-
| Suicide Squad: Hell to Pay || United States || Sam Liu || Warner Bros. AnimationDC Entertainment || Traditional || || || March 27, 2018  || 86 minutes
|-
| The Swan Princess: A Royal Myztery || United States || Richard Rich || Sony Pictures Home EntertainmentCrest Animation Productions || CG Animation || || || March 27, 2018 || 79 minutes
|-
| Tabaluga|| Germany || Sven Unterwaldt || Awesometown Entertainment, Deutsche Columbia, Tempest Film, Trixter || CG animation ||  || || December 6, 2018 || 90 minutes
|-
| Teen Titans Go! To the Movies || United States || Aaron Horvath,Peter Rida Michail || Warner Bros. Animation / DC Entertainment|| Flash || || || July 22, 2018 July 27, 2018  || 84 minutes105 minutes 
|-
| The Testament of Sister New Devil Departures || Japan || Hisashi Saito || Production IMS || Traditional ||  || || March 28, 2018 || 60 minutes
|-
| The Three Heroes. The Heiress to the Throne Три богатыря и наследница престола || Russia || Konstantin Bronzit || Melnitsa Animation Studio || Traditional ||  || || December 27, 2018 || 81 minutes
|-
| Tito and the BirdsTito e os Pássaros || Brazil || Gustavo Steinberg, Gabriel Bitar, André Catoto || Bits Producoes || Traditional || || || June 11, 2018 February 14, 2019  || 73 minutes
|-
| The Tower Wardi || FranceNorwaySweden || Mats Grorud || Les Contes modernes, Cinenic Film, Tenk.tv || Traditional || || || June 11, 2018 November 30, 2018  || 74 minutes
|-
| Troll: The Tale of a Tail|| CanadaNorway || Kevin Munroe || Sagatoon || CG animation || || || December 25, 2018 || 91 minutes
|-
| Two Tails Два Хвоста || Russia || Victor Azeev || Licensing Brands || CG animation ||  || || May 31, 2018 || 77 minutes
|-
| Underdog (Eon-deo-dok) || South Korea || Lee Chun-baek, Oh Sung-yoon || Odolttogi || Traditional ||  || || July 12, 2018 January 16, 2019  || 102 minutes
|-
| Up and Away  Hodja fra Pjort || Denmark || Karsten Kiilerich || A film || CG animation ||  || || February 8, 2018 || 81 minutes
|-
| Ville Neuve || Canada || Félix Dufour-Laperrière || Productions l'Unite Centrale || Traditional ||  || || September 7, 2018  || 76 minutes
|-
| Vitello || Denmark || Dorte Bengtson || Ja Film || Traditional ||  || || February 1, 2018 || 72 minutes
|-
| Willy and the Guardians of the Lake:hu:Lengemesék 2 - Tél a nádtengeren || Hungary || Zsolt Pálfi || Cinemon EntertainmentVertigo Média || Traditional ||  || || December 6, 2018 || 70 minutes
|-
| Wheely: Fast & Hilarious || Malaysia || Yusry Abd Halim (as Yusry Abdul Halim), Carl Mendez || Kartun Studios Malaysia || CG animation || || || August 16, 2018 || 90 minutes
|-
| White FangCroc Blanc || FranceLuxembourgUnited States || Alexandre Espigares || Superprod || CG animation || || || January 21, 2018 March 28, 2018 July 8, 2018  || 85 minutes
|-
| The Wolf HouseLa Casa Lobo || Chile ||  Joaquín Cociña, Cristóbal León ||  Diluvio, Globo Rojo || Stop Motion || || || February 22, 2018  || 75 minutes
|-
| ZOOks || Belgium || Dimitri Leue, Kristoff Leue || The Fridge, Potemkino, Sancta Media || CG animation || || || February 4, 2018 February 10, 2018 July 14, 2018  || 90 minutes
|-
| Zokuowarimonogatari || Japan || TBA || Shaft || Traditional ||  || || November 10, 2018 || 148 minutes
|-
|}

Highest-grossing animated films
The following is a list of the 10 highest-grossing animated feature films first released in 2018.Incredibles 2 became the seventh animated film after Toy Story 3 (2010), Frozen (2013), Minions (2015), Zootopia, Finding Dory (both in 2016), and Despicable Me 3'' (2017) to gross over $1 billion, and is currently the fourth-highest-grossing animated film of all time and the 19th-highest-grossing film of all time.

References

 Feature films
2018
2018-related lists